Jean-Marie Charles Abrial (17 December 1879 – 19 December 1962) was a French Admiral and Naval Minister. He fought in both World wars, and was known mostly for his actions at Dunkirk in 1940.

Early years
Abrial started his career in 1896 at the École Navale, the French naval academy, taking his first post as an aspirant (midshipman) in 1898. During World War I, Abrial served in command of a high-seas patrol boat until 1917, when he joined the Naval Ministry's anti-submarine division. In 1920 he was promoted to Capitaine de frégate (Commander), first commanding the destroyer  and eventually an entire flotilla of destroyers stationed in the Mediterranean Sea.

Promotions
After completing studies at the École Navale near the Atlantic-Coast port of Brest, he was promoted to Capitaine de vaisseau (Captain) in 1925, commanding the heavy cruiser  in 1927–1929 and serving as commanding officer of the 1st Squadron at Toulon. In 1930 he was promoted to Rear Admiral and in 1936 to Vice Admiral, after which he commanded the Mediterranean squadron for three years. In 1939 he was charged with protecting French overseas trade as well as the north coast of France, and the following year General Maxime Weygand named him as Commander-in-Chief of the northern naval forces.

World War II
Abrial worked in cooperation with the British troops during the evacuation of Dunkirk in 1940, even though he had not been informed of it prior to the operation. The operation began on 26 May with the requisitioning of several private boats in attempts to organize assistance from the French Navy. On 29 May the evacuation began; Abrial was one of the last to be evacuated. After evacuation, Abrial was based in Cherbourg — where, as senior officer, he was forced to surrender the port to the Germans on 19 June. From July 1940 to July 1941, he served Philippe Pétain's Vichy regime as the governor general of Algeria. Vichy regime President Pierre Laval appointed him as Naval Minister and commander of naval forces, a position he held from 29 November 1942 until 25 March 1943.

Collaboration
On the downfall of the Vichy regime, Abrial was arrested and charged with collaboration, for which he lost his pension. After the Provisional Government of the French Republic re-established the Haute Cour de justice, that court condemned him for his Nazi collaboration and sentenced him to ten years of forced labor. In December 1947, however, he gained provisional release, and in 1954 he was granted amnesty.

Popular culture
In the 2004 BBC miniseries Dunkirk, Abrial was played by French actor André Oumansky.

References

Bibliography

External links 
  Dictionnaire biographique

1879 births
1962 deaths
People from Tarn (department)
French military personnel of World War I
French Navy admirals of World War II
French collaborators with Nazi Germany
Ministers of Marine
Grand Croix of the Légion d'honneur
Honorary Knights Commander of the Order of the Bath
French Navy admirals
Governors general of Algeria